In the Midst of Beauty is the thirteenth full-length studio album recorded by the various M.S.G. lineups and the tenth studio album by the Michael Schenker Group (MSG). The album was released on 13 May 2008 and marked the comeback of the original MSG singer, Gary Barden, so the MSG name is added with Schenker - Barden on the album's cover.
By Schenker's own notes to the CD, "This title came about through my experience and realisation that - in the midst of beauty - the beast is always waiting and ready to attack...".

Track listing
All titles written by Michael Schenker and Gary Barden

 "City Lights" - 3:44
 "Competition" - 3:20
 "I Want You" - 4:32
 "End of the Line" - 4:01
 "Summerdays" - 5:12
 "A Night to Remember" - 4:39
 "Wings of Emotion" - 4:04
 "Come Closer" - 2:57
 "The Cross of Crosses" - 4:55
 "Na Na" - 3:33
 "I Am the One" - 3:54
 "Ride on My Way" - 4:44

Personnel
Band members
Gary Barden - vocals
Michael Schenker - guitars, producer
Don Airey - keyboards
Neil Murray - bass
Simon Phillips - drums

Production
Romi Schickle - producer, engineer, mixing
Siggi Schwarz - producer, mixing

Charts

References 

2008 albums
Michael Schenker Group albums